is a Japanese voice actor. His most famous role is perhaps Hayato Kobayashi in Mobile Suit Gundam, Mobile Suit Zeta Gundam, Mobile Suit Gundam ZZ, and the MSG Movie Trilogy.

Filmography

Television animation
1970s
Robokko Beeton (1976) – Gakiranger
Hit and Run (1979) – Take
Mobile Suit Gundam (1979) – Hayato Kobayashi; Job John; Lang (ep22); March (ep23); Marker Clan (ep2); Oscar Dublin
1980s
Space Warrior Baldios (1980) – Jack Oliver
Ashita no Joe 2 (1980) – Tarō
Belle and Sebastian (1981) – Partner
Dogtanian and the Three Muskehounds (1981)
Fang of the Sun Dougram (1981) – Fester
Kaibutsu-kun (1981) – Banno
The Kabocha Wine (1982) – Kotaro Hayakawa
Armored Trooper Votoms (1983) – Rador
Bemubemu Hunter Kotengumaru (1983) – Shisumashi
Mobile Suit Zeta Gundam (1985) – Hayato Kobayashi
Mobile Suit Gundam ZZ (1986) – Hayato Kobayashi
Uchuusen Sagittarius (1986)
1990s
Cooking Papa (1992) – Megane
Pokémon (1997) – Gangar
Master Keaton (1998) – Shreider (ep 14)
Outlaw Star (1998) – Hitoriga
Angel Links (1999) – Gordon
2000s
Sugar: A Little Snow Fairy (2001) – Luchino
Ground Defense Force! Mao-chan (2002) – Sorajirou Tsukishima
Mirmo! (2002) – Tain (Fairy School)
Paranoia Agent (2004) – Shinsuke Hatomura (eps 1,10-12)
Beet the Vandel Buster Excellion (2005) – Padro
Canvas 2: Niji Iro no Sketch (2005) – Principal (eps 15,16)
Glass Mask (2005) – Board chairman (ep 42-44,46,48)
Kamichu! (2005) – Gen-san (DVD ep 9)
Black Lagoon: The Second Barrage (2006) – Lobos (eps 16-18)
Gintama (2006) – Murata Jintetsu (Ep. 61); Nezumiya; Space Dad (Ep. 93)
Spider Riders (2006) – Chairman (ep 20)
Oh! Edo Rocket (2007) – Santa
Allison & Lillia (2008) – Terreur (ep 9-10)
Ayakashi: Samurai Horror Tales (2008) – Yahei (Bakeneko)
GeGeGe no Kitarō (5th Series) (2008) – Osore
2010s
Croisée in a Foreign Labyrinth (2011) – Yannick
Crayon Shin-chan (2013) – Shogun Fumin
2020s
Drifting Dragons (2020) – Ura

OVA
Dragon Century (1988) – Gelda
Vampire Princess Miyu (1988) – Miyu's Father
A.D. Police Files (1990) – Hyde Kashew
Hakkenden: Legend of the Dog Warriors (1990) – Yoshirou Ubayaki
Sengoku Busho Retsuden Bakufu Doji Hissatsuman (1990) – Tokugawa Ieyasu
Bubblegum Crash (1991) – D.J. Tommy (Ep 3); Manager (Ep 1)
Moldiver (1993)
Legend of the Galactic Heroes (1996) – Elsheimer
Steel Angel Kurumi Encore (2000) – Narrator (Ep. 26); President (Ep. 25)
New Fist of the North Star (2003) – Ches

Theatrical animation
Mobile Suit Gundam (1981) – Hayato Kobayashi
Mobile Suit Gundam: Soldiers of Sorrow (1981) – Hayato Kobayashi
Mobile Suit Gundam: Encounters in Space (1982) – Hayato Kobayashi
Slayers The Motion Picture (1995) – Sorcerer A
Gintama: The Movie (2010) – Murata Jintetsu
Detective Conan: Private Eye in the Distant Sea (2013) – Hayato Watanabe

Tokusatsu
Juukou B-Fighter (1995) - Synthetic Beast Namakeruge (ep. 12)
Ninpu Sentai Hurricaneger (2002) - Mirage Ninja Jin-Giron (ep. 21-22)

Dubbing

Live-action
Cast Away – Yuri (Peter von Berg)
The Hundred-Foot Journey – Mayor (Michel Blanc)
Loving Vincent – Père Tanguy (John Sessions)
Moonrise Kingdom – Narrator
The Monuments Men – Viktor Stahl (Justus von Dohnányi)
Paris 36 – Pigoil (Gérard Jugnot)

Animation
The Batman – Francis Grey
Police Academy – Zed McGlunk
Thomas and Friends - Duck (Season 12 onwards(succeeding Kōzō Shioya) and Sir Robert Norramby (Season 17 onwards(replacing Shingo Fufimori)

References

External links
 

Japanese male voice actors
1950 births
Living people